Szepetnek is a village in Zala County, Hungary with a population of less than 1800.

References

External links 
 Street map 

Populated places in Zala County